My Wife's Dignity (Egyptian Arabic: كرامة زوجتي translit: Karamet Zawgati or Karamat Zawjati) is 1967 Egyptian film written by Ihsan Abdel Quddous and directed by Fatin Abdel Wahab. The film stars Salah Zulfikar and Shadia.

Plot
Mahmoud is a womanizer. He spends all his time in relationships without thinking about marriage and tries to get close to Nadia, his club partner for five years, but she repels him, forcing him to ask for marriage and stipulates that before agreeing that if he betrays her, she will betray him in the same way.  Mahmoud agrees and marries her, and she succeeds in turning him into another successful person in his working life. After months of marriage, the wife suspects her husband’s actions, then discovers his betrayal with one of his clients, and begins to act with him in a way that suggests that she is cheating on him, which makes him live in torment and pain, and when the suspicion increases, he divorces her and leaves  Cairo to forget his pain, and when he returns to his office, he is surprised by the agent of the office, and he presents him with a file, and he sees the documents that confirm that his wife did not cheat on him and knows that everything that happened was just an act, he decides to return to his wife after she had taught him an unforgettable lesson.

Cast
 Salah Zulfikar: Mahmoud Mokhtar
Shadia: Nadia
 Ragaa Al-Geddawy: Suhair
 George Sidhom: Samida Abdel Samad - Al-Jasoon
 Adel emam: Amin
Sharifa Maher: Salwa
 Zeinat Olwi: Dancer
Mahmoud Rashad: Nadia's uncle
 Thoraya Helmy: Dancer

References

External links
 
My Wife’s Dignity on elCinema

1967 films
Egyptian black-and-white films
Egyptian romantic drama films
20th-century Egyptian films
1960s Arabic-language films
Films shot in Egypt
1967 romantic drama films